The men's 400 metres event at the 1951 Pan American Games was held at the Estadio Monumental in Buenos Aires on 3 and 4 March.

Medalists

Results

Heats
Held on 3 March

Semifinals
Held on 3 March

Final
Held on 4 March

References

Athletics at the 1951 Pan American Games
1951